Doctor of Civil Law (DCL) is a degree offered by some universities, such as the University of Oxford, instead of the more common Doctor of Laws (LLD) degrees.

At Oxford, the degree is a higher doctorate usually awarded on the basis of exceptionally insightful and distinctive publications that contain significant and original contributions to the study of law or politics in general. The DCL is senior to all degrees save the Doctor of Divinity which was traditionally the highest degree bestowed by the Universities. The degree of Doctor of Canon Law was replaced by the DCL after the Reformation.
The degree of Doctor of Civil Law by Diploma is customarily conferred on foreign Heads of State, as well as on the Chancellor of the University. (The British Sovereign is unable to receive university degrees, since these would theoretically place him under the jurisdiction of the Chancellor of the university. Prior to her accession, Queen Elizabeth II of the UK accepted several honorary degrees, including an Oxford DCL in 1948.)

The following other higher institutions also provide for awarding DCL degrees:

 University of Durham, United Kingdom
 University of Newcastle upon Tyne, United Kingdom
 University of Kent, Kent, United Kingdom
 McGill University Faculty of Law, Montreal, Quebec Canada
 Louisiana State University Paul M. Hebert Law Center, Baton Rouge, Louisiana, United States
 Pontifical Lateran University, Rome
 Royal and Pontifical University of Santo Tomas, Philippines

In some other universities, the DCL is an honorary degree.

See also 
Doctor of Laws
Lambeth degree
Michael Faraday

References

Law degrees
Civil Law
Academic courses at the University of Oxford